Cornish College of the Arts (CCA) is a private art college in Seattle, Washington. It was founded in 1914.

History 
Cornish College of the Arts was founded in 1914 as the Cornish School of Music, by Nellie Cornish (1876–1956), a teacher of piano. In 1915, the school was known as The Cornish School of Music Language and Dancing. Cornish would go on to serve as the school's director for its first 25 years, until 1939. The Cornish School of Music began its operations in rented space in the Boothe (or Booth) Building on Broadway and Pine Street. 

As Cornish developed the idea of her school, she initially turned to the Montessori-based pedagogical method of Evelyn Fletcher-Copp, but turned at last to the progressive musical pedagogy of Calvin Brainerd Cady, who had worked as musical director with John Dewey as the latter set up his seminal progressive educational project, what is now the University of Chicago Laboratory Schools. Conceived by Cornish as "an elementary school of the arts—all the arts—with music as its major subject," the school initially taught only children, but it soon expanded to functioning also as a normal school (a teachers' college) under Cady.  Within three years it had enrolled over 600 students, expanded the age range of its students to college age, and was the country's largest music school west of Chicago.

Nellie Cornish recruited opportunistically where she saw talent, and the school soon offered classes as diverse as eurhythmics, French language, painting, dance (folk and ballet), and theater.  In 1915, the first full academic year, eurhythmics was added and the first studio arts classes taught. Dance, with a ballet focus, became a department in 1916 headed by Chicago-trained Mary Ann Wells. That year, Cornish became one of the first West Coast schools of any type to offer a summer session. After the closing of their influential Chicago Little Theatre, Maurice Browne and Ellen Van Volkenburg were brought in to found the Drama Department in 1918; the department, with its incorporation of scenic design, music, and dance in its productions, became central to Cornish's plans to ally the arts.  Van Volkenburg also began a marionette department, the first such department in the country.  By 1923, opera and modern dance had been added to the curriculum as well.

In 1920, in recognition that music was no longer the school's central focus, the school's name was simplified to The Cornish School. By this time, too, the school had expanded its age range, and was offering classes and lessons from early childhood to the undergraduate level. The school gathered a board of trustees from among Seattle's elite, who funded the school through the hard economic times during and after World War I, and raised money for a purpose-built school building. Finished in 1921, the Cornish School building, now known as Kerry Hall, opened for the 1921–22 academic year.

The Cornish Trio of the 1920s—Peter Meremblum, Berthe Poncy (later Berthe Poncy Jacobson), and Kola Levienne—may have been the first resident chamber music group at an American school. In 1935, Cornish established the first (but ultimately short-lived) college-level school of radio broadcasting in the U.S.

Through the 1920s, the school was often on the edge of financial failure, but was of a caliber that prompted Anna Pavlova to call it "the kind of school other schools should follow."  Although the mortgage was paid off and the building had been donated to the school in 1929, financial difficulties inevitably grew during the Great Depression. Ultimately, convinced that finances would not allow the school to do more than "tread water",  Nellie Cornish resigned her position as head of the school in 1939.

Campus 
Cornish College of the Arts operates a three-part campus in the Capitol Hill, Denny Triangle, and Seattle Center areas of Seattle, Washington.

Cornish's historic campus is composed of its original 1921 building on Capitol Hill and its grounds. The building, now known as Kerry Hall, contains the 200-seat PONCHO Concert Hall. Kerry Hall was designed in the Spanish Colonial Revival style by leading Seattle architect Abraham H. Albertson and is on the National Register of Historic Places (NRHP) as the "Cornish School".

Cornish opened its new Main Campus in 2003 in the Denny Triangle area of downtown Seattle. The 1928, Art Deco-style Main Campus Center is listed on the NRHP as  "William Volker Building". Other buildings of note are the Raisbeck Performance Hall constructed in 1915, a Seattle City Landmark under the name "Old Norway Hall", and the 1929 Notion Building. In 2015, the college opened the new 20-story Cornish Commons, which contains a residence hall, studios, and meeting rooms.

Located on the Seattle Center grounds is the Cornish Playhouse at Seattle Center, the college's premier performance venue. Built for the Century 21 Exposition of 1962, the Playhouse was leased to Cornish by the City of Seattle in 2013. Along with the 440-seat main stage, the complex includes the 100+ seat Alhadeff Studio Theater and a scene shop.

Library 
The library at Cornish College specializes in art, dance, design, music, performance production, and theatre.   it held 4,700 CDs, 40,000 books, has 2,200 videos, and subscribed to 154 periodicals.  Its special collections include an image collection and 35 mm slides.

Notable alumni

Actors 

 Brendan Fraser, who graduated from Cornish in 1990, is one of Cornish's best known graduates.
Jinkx Monsoon, who graduated in 2010, is a drag queen, actor and singer and best known for winning both the 5th regular season and 7th All Stars season of RuPaul's Drag Race.

Fine artists 

 Aleah Chapin, who graduated in 2009, became the first American painter to win the prestigious BP Portrait Award from the National Portrait Gallery, London. 
 Terry Fox, first generation Conceptual artist and a central participant in the West Coast performance art, video and sound scene of the late 1960s and 1970s.
Heather Hart, graduated in 1998, is best known for her large art installations. 
 Kumi Yamashita graduated with a B.F.A. in Art 1994.

Musicians 
 Jeff Eden Fair, Composer, multi-instrumentalist and Grammy-winning music producer, studied music at Cornish in 1976-77. Known for his film, television and movie trailer scores including a RIAA Gold Record (Best Of Bond: James Bond) for the Parodi/Fair version of The James Bond Theme.
 Catherine Harris-White, aka SassyBlack, is co-creator of non defunct group Thee Satisfaction, recording artists on Sub Pop Records, graduated from the Music Department in 2008.
 Mary Lambert, a Grammy-nominated singer-songwriter, debuted on Capitol Records with her album Heart on My Sleeve.
 Lena Raine, composer and producer, known for her video game soundtracks.
 Reggie Watts, musician and comedian, studied music at Cornish in the early 1990s.
 Ann Wilson, musician, member of the band, Heart.

Dancers 

 Merce Cunningham is the best known alumnus in the dance department, matriculated in 1937 and was lured away by Martha Graham and her dance company in 1939. 
 Robert Joffrey, dancer and choreographer, studied at Cornish at some point, and is listed as a member of the alumni association.

References 

 Mildred Andrews, Cornish School, HistoryLink Essay 596, December 26, 1998, updated on June 28, 2006.

External links 

 

 
Universities and colleges in Seattle
Art schools in Washington (state)
National Register of Historic Places in Seattle
Educational institutions established in 1914
Design schools in the United States
Universities and colleges accredited by the Northwest Commission on Colleges and Universities
University and college buildings on the National Register of Historic Places in Washington (state)
1914 establishments in Washington (state)
Private universities and colleges in Washington (state)